The 63rd parallel north is a circle of latitude that is 63 degrees north of the Earth's equatorial plane. It crosses the Atlantic Ocean, Europe, Asia and North America.

At this latitude the sun is visible for 20 hours, 19 minutes during the summer solstice and 4 hours, 43 minutes during the winter solstice. If the latitude in the northern hemisphere is 63º45′ or smaller, everyday of the month of September (before equinox) can view both astronomical dawn and astronomical dusk.

Around the world
Starting at the Prime Meridian and heading eastwards, the parallel 63° north passes through:

{| class="wikitable plainrowheaders"
! scope="col" width="125" | Co-ordinates
! scope="col" | Country, territory or ocean
! scope="col" | Notes
|-
| style="background:#b0e0e6;" | 
! scope="row" style="background:#b0e0e6;" | Atlantic Ocean
| style="background:#b0e0e6;" | Norwegian Sea
|-
| 
! scope="row" | 
| Skerries of, and Møre og Romsdal proper
|-
| style="background:#b0e0e6;" | 
! scope="row" style="background:#b0e0e6;" | Atlantic Ocean
| style="background:#b0e0e6;" | Lauvøyfjorden, Norwegian Sea
|-
| 
! scope="row" | 
| Averøy, Møre og Romsdal
|-
| style="background:#b0e0e6;" | 
! scope="row" style="background:#b0e0e6;" | Atlantic Ocean
| style="background:#b0e0e6;" | Kvernesfjorden, Norwegian Sea
|-
| 
! scope="row" | 
| Aspøya, Møre og Romsdal
|-
| style="background:#b0e0e6;" | 
! scope="row" style="background:#b0e0e6;" | Atlantic Ocean
| style="background:#b0e0e6;" | Tingvollfjorden, Norwegian Sea
|-
| 
! scope="row" | 
| Tingvoll, Møre og Romsdal proper
|-
| style="background:#b0e0e6;" | 
! scope="row" style="background:#b0e0e6;" | Atlantic Ocean
| style="background:#b0e0e6;" | Trongfjorden, Norwegian Sea
|-
| 
! scope="row" | 
| Surnadal, Møre og Romsdal
|-
| style="background:#b0e0e6;" | 
! scope="row" style="background:#b0e0e6;" | Atlantic Ocean
| style="background:#b0e0e6;" | Hamnesfjorden, Norwegian Sea
|-
| 
! scope="row" | 
| Møre og Romsdal, Trøndelag
|-
| 
! scope="row" | 
|Mainland and Ulvön Island
|-
| style="background:#b0e0e6;" | 
! scope="row" style="background:#b0e0e6;" | Atlantic Ocean
| style="background:#b0e0e6;" | Gulf of Bothnia, Baltic Sea
|-
| 
! scope="row" | 
|
|-
| 
! scope="row" | 
|
|-
| style="background:#b0e0e6;" | 
! scope="row" style="background:#b0e0e6;" | Pacific Ocean
| style="background:#b0e0e6;" | Bering Sea
|-
| 
! scope="row" | 
| Alaska - St. Lawrence Island
|-
| style="background:#b0e0e6;" | 
! scope="row" style="background:#b0e0e6;" | Pacific Ocean
| style="background:#b0e0e6;" | Bering Sea
|-
| 
! scope="row" | 
| Alaska
|-valign="top"
| 
! scope="row" | 
| Yukon Northwest Territories Nunavut
|-
| style="background:#b0e0e6;" | 
! scope="row" style="background:#b0e0e6;" rowspan="2" | Arctic Ocean
| style="background:#b0e0e6;" | Hudson BayPassing just south of Southampton Island, Nunavut, 
|-
| style="background:#b0e0e6;" | 
| style="background:#b0e0e6;" | Fisher Strait, Hudson Bay
|-
| 
! scope="row" | 
| Nunavut - Bencas Island 
|-
| style="background:#b0e0e6;" | 
! scope="row" style="background:#b0e0e6;" rowspan="3" | Arctic Ocean
| style="background:#b0e0e6;" | Evans Strait, Hudson BayPassing just north of Coats Island, Nunavut, 
|-
| style="background:#b0e0e6;" | 
| style="background:#b0e0e6;" | Hudson Bay
|-
| style="background:#b0e0e6;" | 
| style="background:#b0e0e6;" | Hudson StraitPassing just south of Nottingham Island, Nunavut, 
|-
| 
! scope="row" | 
| Nunavut - Meta Incognita Peninsula, Baffin Island 
|-
| style="background:#b0e0e6;" | 
! scope="row" style="background:#b0e0e6;" | Arctic Ocean
| style="background:#b0e0e6;" | Frobisher Bay, Davis Strait
|-
| 
! scope="row" | 
| Nunavut - Chase Island and Hall Peninsula, Baffin Island
|-
| style="background:#b0e0e6;" | 
! scope="row" style="background:#b0e0e6;" | Arctic Ocean
| style="background:#b0e0e6;" | Davis Strait
|-
| 
! scope="row" | 
|
|-
| style="background:#b0e0e6;" | 
! scope="row" style="background:#b0e0e6;" | Atlantic Ocean
| style="background:#b0e0e6;" | Passing 32 km south of Surtsey, 
|-
|}

See also
62nd parallel north
64th parallel north

n63